Unknown Rooms: A Collection of Acoustic Songs is a compilation album from American singer-songwriter Chelsea Wolfe. It was released on October 16, 2012. The album is considered to be a collection of songs that were "once-orphaned, [and] given a home," rather than Wolfe's next full-length album.

Background
Once Wolfe signed with L.A. based Sargent House Records, they suggested that she re-released some of her older, acoustic music that was "floating around the internet" and never saw a wide release. The majority of these tracks are songs that Wolfe had been working on for several years, but are new recordings of these tracks entirely, with the exception of the two digital bonus tracks, which are original recordings.

The song "Boyfriend" is a cover of the song by Karlos Rene Ayala, and was also co-composed by Ben Chisholm, a bandmate of Wolfe's.

Release
On Oct. 9, the album was made available to stream for free via SoundCloud, after being previously leaked the month before.

On January 25, 2013, a music video was released for the song, "Flatlands," as a collaboration with Converse and Decibel Magazine.

Reception

Critical

Unknown Rooms was met with positive reviews from music critics, on Metacritic, which assigns a normalized rating out of 100 to reviews from mainstream critics, the album received an average score of 73 based on 8 reviews, indicating "generally favorable reviews." Jayson Green of Pitchfork Media scored the album a 7.7, saying that, "Unknown Rooms is a short album, but its nine songs capture and sustain free-floating fear and menace," while Adrian Agacer of Tiny Mix Tapes gave the album four stars, stating, "This is a sparse album, Chelsea Wolfe’s quietest, most beautiful album to date, showcasing a vulnerability that simultaneously pushes the listener’s comfort level to its limits and is sincerely inviting in its simplicity. Unlike last year’s Apokalypsis, which had its moments of anarchic liveliness and heightened motions and speeds (“Demons"), Unknown Rooms is entirely built on pure rests and negative space, the nerve-racking space of silence."

Commercial
Unknown Rooms is Wolfe's first album to chart in the US, marking it her most successful album thus far.

Track listing

Personnel
Chelsea Wolfe – lead vocals, acoustic guitar, record producer
Ben Chisholm – drums, analog synths, piano, backing vocals, production

Additional personnel
Ezra Buchla – viola 
Andrea Calderon – violin 
Daniel Denton – bass 
Jere Wolfe – guitar

Charts

References

External links
 Album's Bandcamp page

2012 albums
Sargent House albums
Chelsea Wolfe albums